Direct-to-TV may refer to:

 Dedicated console, a video game console with built-in games
 Television film, a feature-length film produced for release on a television network